Families and Friends of Lesbians and Gays (FFLAG) is a voluntary organisation and registered charity in the United Kingdom which offers support to parents and their lesbian/gay/bisexual and transgender children.  They have a national telephone helpline (0300 688 0368 <changed in 2020>) as well as several parent support groups and are a support group recognised by the UK Government. FFLAG also works outside the UK with other LGBT family support organisations particularly in Europe.

Formation

Rose Robertson
The organisation has its roots in 1965 when Rose Robertson (1916 - 2011), a former World War II SOE agent set up Parents Enquiry, inspired by events she had seen whilst working with the resistance in occupied France. Rose was herself heterosexual, her maiden name being Laimbeer, Rose had married George Robertson in 1954, he died in 1984. Rose launched Britain's first helpline to assist, inform and support parents and their lesbian, gay and bisexual sons and daughters three years before the Sexual Offences Act 1967 decriminalised homosexuality in England and Wales in a period of severe Homophobia, when LGBT+ people regularly experienced prejudice, harassment and oppression. Rose used her own home and money to help young LGBT+ people in need.

Parents Enquiry

Rose Robertson was receiving over 100 phone calls and letters a week from highly distressed gay teenagers, many of whom had self harmed. Rose often mediated between parents mostly successfully, who had rejected their own sons and daughters due to sexuality. Despite being verbally abused, physically attacked, targeted with extreme homophobia and Right-wing extremists, arson attacks on her home, excrement through the letterbox, abusive phone calls and hate mail she did not give up and persevered until her death in helping young LGBT+ people.

Obituaries to Rose appeared in The Telegraph, The Guardian and The Pink Paper news papers and at the Peter Tatchell Foundation. The Manchester Parents Group had produced a video introduced by Sir Ian McKellen in 1990 in which Rose Robertson appeared, one of the last surviving VHS Video copies, although in worn condition was transferred by a volunteer to Mpeg video in 1999 for preservation.

National Movement

The helpline that Rose created ran for three decades and Rose's work inspired parents in various parts of the country to set up their own groups and helplines. Among the first were those in Manchester, Leicester and Scotland.
By 1993 it was felt that there was a need for a national organisation to act as an umbrella group to support and co-ordinate the local groups and to respond to the increasing request for information from the media, social services and other organisations and individuals.

FFLAG

'Friends and Families of Lesbians and Gays' (FFLAG) was the successor to Parents Enquiry set up in 1993, and became a registered charity in 2000 with aims were to support parents and their lesbian, gay and bisexual daughters and sons and to campaign for human and civil rights.  FFLAG is a totally voluntary organisation; it has no statutory funding and is totally dependent on donations.

The equal rights legislation FFLAG has campaigned for include:

 The repeal of section 28
 Equalisation of the age of consent
 Lifting the ban on gays and lesbians in the armed forces
 Adoption rights for same sex couples
 Civil partnership
 Same sex marriage

In 2000 FFLAG joined with parent's organisations in Italy, France, Belgium, Germany and Spain to set up EuroFFLAG, now followed by the European Network of Parents of LGBTQI children.

FFLAG's vision

FFLAG's vision: is a world free from ignorance and prejudice about sexuality and gender identity in which LGBT+ people are valued and respected

Their mission:

To support families with LGBT+ members

 To be the national umbrella organisation for affiliated groups supporting families with LGBT+ members
 To support and develop a network of local family support groups
 To provide direct individual support where local family support groups are not involved
 To educate and advocate for a world in line with their vision
 To  work with other organisations to achieve their vision
 To ensure that they have the necessary resources to achieve their mission

Support Resources

FFLAG's website provides information about helpful resources including their downloadable booklets.  The booklet 'A Guide For Family & Friends' looks at issues and emotions that parents and families may face when their LGB loved one comes out.  Another booklet 'How Do I Tell My Parents?' considers ways of telling parents as well as discussing the issues that often worry lesbian, gay and bisexual people when they want to talk to their family about their sexuality.  The booklets, originally written by Rose Robertson, were rewritten by FFLAG Parents in 2012 and updated again in 2017.  The booklets contain quotes and experiences from parents and LGB young people.

FFLAG has found that many of the enquiries currently received are from parents of trans youngsters.  They have decided to extend their remit to include support for family and friends of trans people.

On 31 March 2018, coinciding with Trans Visibility Day, FFLAG launched its new booklet 'A Guide For Family & Friends - information for family and friends with a transgender member'.

There are plans for a second new booklet 'How Do I Tell My Parents? - I'm transgender' to be available later this year.

Trustees

President of the organisation is Jenny Broughton, Hugh Fell is Chair of Trustee's alongside fellow Trustee's Sorrel Atkinson, Janet Kent, Hilary Beynon and Sarah Furley.

Patrons

Long standing Patrons of the organisation are Baron Cashman of Limehouse, Angela Mason CBE, Sir Ian McKellen CH CBE, Baroness Massey of Darwen, Professor Ian Rivers, Deidre Sanders and Peter Tatchell.

See also
PFLAG

References

External links

'Parents Talking', free online video resource, produced 1990

LGBT organisations in the United Kingdom
LGBT family and peer support groups
Social welfare charities based in the United Kingdom
1993 establishments in the United Kingdom
Organizations established in 1993